This is a list of holders of the office of mayor of the German city of Augsburg.
For simplicity they are all called mayors, although the title varied over the centuries.

On the head of the city Augsburg as chairman of the town council governed since 1266 the so-called Stadtpfleger, sometimes also called mayor, so it happened that both titles were in use at the same time.

By 1548 the title was fixed as Stadtpfleger. These officiated for some years and after that they were elected for lifetime. This is why there were sometimes two or more Stadtpfleger simultaneously.

After the transfer to Bavaria in 1806 Augsburg constituted a magistracy with two mayors. It was supported by an additional council of so-called "community commissioners" (Gemeindebevollmächtige).

Since 1907 the mayor has been called Oberbürgermeister, because Augsburg reached a population of 100,000. The title is stated in the Bavarian Gemeindeordnung.

Until 1919 mostly mayors were members of the aristocracy. After the last German Kaiser Wilhelm II was deposed, and the implementation of democracy, the officeholder was elected. From this time on, the mayor normally was a member of a political party.

Nineteenth century

20th century

21st century

See also
 Timeline of Augsburg

References

Augsburg
Bavaria-related lists